Eupithecia swettii is a moth in the family Geometridae first described by John Arthur Grossbeck in 1907. It is found in eastern North America, from Quebec and Massachusetts to North Carolina in the south-east and through Missouri and Kansas to Mississippi. It is also found in eastern Texas.

The length of the forewings is 8.5–10.5 mm. The forewings are light fawn brown shading to grayish brown. The hindwings are slightly paler than the forewings. Adults are on wing from January to April in the south and to May and even July in the north.

References

Moths described in 1907
swettii
Moths of North America